Franco Venturini (born 26 May 1959) is an Italian rower. He competed in the men's coxed pair event at the 1976 Summer Olympics.

References

1959 births
Living people
Italian male rowers
Olympic rowers of Italy
Rowers at the 1976 Summer Olympics
Place of birth missing (living people)